The list is based on CIA World Factbook estimates. Countries or dependent territories without a 2017 estimate are omitted.

List

References 

Population growth rate
Population Growth Rate, Oceania